Madeleine Louise Mitchell MMus, ARCM, GRSM, FRSA is a British violinist who has performed as a soloist and chamber musician in over forty countries. She has a wide repertoire and is particularly known for commissioning and premiering new works and for promoting British music in concert and on disc.

Mitchell is a professor at the Royal College of Music, Artistic Director of the Red Violin festival and Director of the London Chamber Ensemble She was also a member of The Fires of London and the Michael Nyman Band.

Biography

Education

Mitchell was a Junior Exhibitioner at the Royal College of Music from the age of 12 to 18, studying violin with Bertha Stevens and piano with Aida Lovell.  Mitchell's secondary education was at Hornchurch Grammar School.

As an Open Foundation Scholar at the Royal College of Music, Mitchell won the Tagore Gold Medal  in 1978, graduating with First Class Honours, winning the 1st prize for GRSM and prizes for violin, chamber music and orchestral leadership, with repertoire lessons from Hugh Bean.

As Fulbright/ITT Fellow Mitchell gained a master's degree in New York at the Eastman and Juilliard schools studying with  Sylvia Rosenberg, working as her graduate assistant, Donald Weilerstein and Dorothy DeLay. Mitchell was awarded a Fellowship to the Aspen Festival 1980-82. She recalls that DeLay was "kind, perceptive and inspiring" teacher and that the "late night lessons in Aspen… were some of the best".

Performing career
Mitchell won the Worshipful Company of Musicians Maisie Lewis Young Artist Award in 1984, resulting in her debut at the Purcell Room at London's South Bank Centre, with further recitals there as Park Lane Group Young Artist 1985 and as winner of the Kirckman Concert Society recital award 1986, when she commissioned her first work, Fantasia by Brian Elias. Mitchell served from 1985-1987 as the violinist/violist member of Peter Maxwell Davies's performing group, The Fires of London. In 1992, she was a member of the Michael Nyman Band; she performed on the recording The Michael Nyman Songbook and appeared in Volker Schlöndorff's concert film.

Mitchell was one of the artists representing Britain in both the festival UKinNY with a recital at Lincoln Center  and for the centenary of Entente Cordiale with France. She has given recitals at Sydney Opera House (17.3.89), Seoul Center for the Arts (13.4.89) and Hong Kong (18.4.89) as part of a three month tour with the pianist Klaus Zoll under the auspices of the British Council and the Goethe Institute. Mitchell has played at many international and most of the major British festivals and frequently performs in London. She was leader of the Bridge String Quartet 2000-2007. She was invited by Norbert Brainin to perform with him for his 80th birthday concert at Wigmore Hall in 2003. Mitchell performed a solo recital at the Wigmore Hall in March 2015 accompanied by Nigel Clayton. Other artists with whom she has collaborated include Paul Watkins, Joanna MacGregor, Craig Ogden and Roger Chase. Her recitals have frequently been broadcast by BBC, S4C, ABC and Bayerischer Rundfunk.

Mitchell had considerable success with her 2007 album; "Violin Songs" a collection of short lyrical pieces performed with pianist Andrew Ball, which was named a Classic FM CD of the Week.  Photograph of Mitchell (above), on the cover of Violin Songs, features her Giuseppe Rocca violin made in 1839.

Mitchell has performed a wide repertoire of concertos with major orchestras including the St Petersburg Philharmonic (2009), Czech and Polish Radio Symphony, Wurttemberg and Munich Chamber, the Royal Philharmonic (Bruch Violin Concerto no.1 conducted by Sir Alexander Gibson in 1993 as part of the English Heritage Series), Welsh Chamber Orchestra, Orchestra de Bahia Brazil, Malaga Symphony of Spain and for the BBC. She performed with BBC National Orchestra of Wales in 2021 in Vaughan Williams The Lark Ascending and Grace Williams Violin Concerto, broadcast on BBC Radio 3, to be released by Nimbus.

Major festivals in which she has been invited include ISCM World Music Days Warsaw, Huddersfield Contemporary Music Festival, Articulacouns (Brazil), Vale of Glamorgan Festival (4 times), Canberra International Music Festival (Artist-in-Residence 2013) and the BBC Proms

Mitchell is the Director of the London Chamber Ensemble www.LondonChamberEnsemble.co.uk. She was made a Fellow of the Royal Society of Arts in 2000

Teaching
Mitchell has been a professor at the Royal College of Music since 1994 and was a member of the RCM Council, elected by the professors 2013-16. Mitchell's students have won the Making Music prize and Park Lane Young Artists' Awards. Mitchell instigated Performance Seminars as the Graduate Pathway Leader for Solo/Ensemble students 2000-2011.  She has frequently chaired examination panels, mentors students in the Centre for Performance Science and was invited to act as consultant for the major EU-funded TELMI project 2016-19.

Red Violin Festival
Mitchell is the Artistic Director of the Red Violin which has taken place in 1997 and 2007 in Cardiff. The eclectic international festival celebrates the fiddle across the arts, the title inspired by Le Violin Rouge paintings and covers "all things violin, including classical, fiddling, Indian and jazz use of the instrument" and was enthusiastically received by the media. Mitchell interviewed the Festival's Founder Patron, Lord Menuhin in 1997 for the BBC.

The October 2007 Red Violin festival included two world premieres performances by Mitchell with percussion group Ensemble Bash and the launch of her CD 'Violin Songs' featuring Elizabeth Watts. as well as showing of the Red Violin film.

Commissions and Premieres
Mitchell is noted for commissioning new music and premiering works in a range of styles, often written for her as gifts.

Mitchell recorded Michael Nyman's work 'On The Fiddle', written for her in 1993, and two works written for her by James MacMillan - Kiss on Word (1994) and A Different World (1995) as part of her album In Sunlight: Pieces for Madeleine Mitchell NMC D098 of music written for her by Brian Elias, Stuart Jones, Stephen Montague, Nigel Osborne, Anthony Powers, and John Woolrich with pianist Andrew Ball in 2005 

Mitchell had a violin concerto written for her by Piers Hellawell - Quadruple Elegy in The Time of Freedom, which she premiered with the Ulster Orchestra and gave the London premiere at the Queen Elizabeth Hall in 1992 with the City of London Orchestra. She received an Arts Council England Award to commission and premiere a unique 'concerto' she devised for violin with voices by Jonathan Harvey, Thierry Pecou and Roxanna Panufnik. She received a further award for her 3-year collaboration 'FiddleSticks' with Ensemble Bash to commission and perform new works for solo violin and percussion by Anne Dudley, Tarik O'Regan and Stuart Jones as companion pieces to Lou Harrison Violin Concerto with Percussion Orchestra, which they performed without conductor, including Symphony Hall International Series and recorded.

She premiered the Violin Concerto written for her by Guto Pryderi Puw, 'Soft Stillness' in 2014 with Orchestra of the Swan and recorded the work live with the BBC National Orchestra of Wales in 2017, included on her album Violin Muse  with works written for Mitchell by David Matthews, Sadie Harrison, Michael Nyman and Geoffrey Poole together with premiere recordings of works by Judith Weir and Michael Berkeley. She premiered the Suite for violin and piano written for her by Robert Saxton at the Three Choirs Festival 2019.
 Mitchell commissioned a work by Errollyn Wallen, 'Sojourner Truth' for violin and piano, supported by the RVW Trust, which she premiered on International Women's Day 2021 in a livestream concert at St John's Smith Square, London in the programme curated by Mitchell with her London Chamber Ensemble: 'A Century of Music by UK Women' 1921-2021, featured on BBC Radio 4 Woman's Hour  and BBC Radio 3 In Tune.

Discography

References

External links
 
 Profile from Royal College of Music

British classical violinists
Living people
Year of birth missing (living people)
20th-century classical violinists
21st-century classical violinists
20th-century British musicians
21st-century British musicians
20th-century British women musicians
21st-century British women musicians
Alumni of the Royal College of Music
Academics of the Royal College of Music